The Church of God (Guthrie, Oklahoma), also known as the Church of God Evening Light, is a Christian denomination in the Wesleyan-Arminian and Restorationist traditions, being aligned with the conservative holiness movement.

History
The origin of the Church of God lies in the holiness movement, particularly the teaching of Daniel Sidney Warner that led to the establishment of the Church of God (Anderson). Distinctives included the teaching that "all believers are members of the church of God" and the "concept of unity among believers." The Church of God taught nonresistance and held that "interracial worship was a sign of the true Church", with both whites and blacks ministering regularly in Church of God congregations, which invited people of all races to worship there. Those who were entirely sanctified testified that they were "saved, sanctified, and prejudice removed." Though outsiders would sometimes attack Church of God services and camp meetings for their stand for racial equality, Church of God members were "undeterred even by violence" and "maintained their strong interracial position as the core of their message of the unity of all believers".

George Winn, an ex-slave, founded the Guthrie congregation itself at Guthrie in 1905. Its early work toward racial integration gained it the pejorative title The Church of God (Holstein). The Guthrie congregation and associated congregations are from a group who under the leadership of C.E. Orr dissolved fellowship with Church of God (Anderson) as a result of controversies, chiefly "worldly conformity in dress", that arose regarding liberal versus conservative issues during the years 1910-1917; the Church of God is thus among the progenitors of the conservative holiness movement though it remains generally isolated due to its anti-sectarian position. The Guthrie congregation felt that the larger Church of God (Anderson) was compromising the original teachings of the Evening Light Reformation and chose to remain with what they believed to be the original standards. They felt that this could easily be ascertained by comparing the teachings of the Anderson Movement at that time with the original writings of the Evening Light Reformation. The term "Evening Lights Saints", connected to the Church of God's mission to evangelism, is derived from : "...it shall come to pass, that at evening time it shall be light."

In 2003, the Church of God (Guthrie, Oklahoma) had 43 congregations in 18 states in the United States; (the largest concentrations being in Oklahoma and California). The church does not keep membership rolls. Faith and Victory (founded 1923) is a monthly publication of the church. Through mission efforts the church has extended into at least 11 other countries outside of the U.S., including India, Mexico, Nigeria and the Philippines.

Theology and practices
This body teaches that believers should closely follow the teachings of The Bible. They see an example in spiritual leaders of the holiness movement such as Daniel Sidney Warner, among others, that were instrumental in bringing about the "Evening Light Reformation." They believe that God began to restore the church to the standards and light of the early morning church era through Warner and others in 1880. 

The doctrines and practices of the church reflect those of the Church of God (Anderson) in its earlier days. In comparison, the church maintains a stronger emphasis on outward, practical holiness and separation from cultural trends of the world than the present Anderson Movement. Entire Sanctification is held as a second work of grace after the New Birth. The Church of God teaches that "Acts of benevolence and charity are foundational to the life of a Christian" and that "True godly love and religious faith are demonstrated through sacrifice in ministering to the needy and less fortunate." In keeping with the standard of holiness, a ministerial statement was issued in 1959 taking a stand against people in leadership positions in the church having televisions in their homes. Those who attend the Church of God practice plain dress and do not wear jewelry, inclusive of wedding rings. Women do not wear makeup or cut their hair; "plaiting or interweaving material or other items into the hair is forbidden". In keeping with the doctrine of outward holiness, men keep their hair cut short and wear pants, while women wear long skirts or dresses. The church teaches that the committing of willful sin, and that alone, disqualifies someone from being a member.

As the Church of God teaches nonresistance, it falls into the subcategory of Holiness Pacifists (along with other denominations such as the Emmanuel Association of Churches). It teaches that marriage is "a lifetime union between one man and one woman" and forbids the remarriage of divorced persons. 

Practices of the church include baptism by immersion, the Lord's supper, feet washing, lifting up holy hands, anointing with oil, divine healing, fasting and a cappella singing. With regard to the administration of Holy Communion, the Church of God teaches that "communion of the body and blood of the Lord among believers could not be signified in any other way than by all of them partaking of one loaf and one cup...A number of small individual glasses and a number of small individual wafers or pieces of bread may be a proper signification of sectism and division, or maybe of individualism, but not of the unity and oneness of believers as they partake of that one bread and one body." The Church of God has a ministry of elders and deacons. Teaching on the end of time is that the second coming of the Lord represents the end of the world and the end of life on the world for all people, both good and evil, without there being a one thousand-year reign on earth or second chance for the wicked to repent. Free-will offering is taught rather than tithing, and the ministry believes in living by faith rather than accepting salaries. Although Guthrie is home to one of the larger congregations in this fellowship, Guthrie is not the headquarters. The church teaches that Christ is the head of the church and that the headquarters is in heaven. An ecclesiastical hierarchy with one man having the preeminence over others is considered man-rule and not the pattern described in the Bible for church leadership. It opposes the Pentecostal practice of glossolalia.

Camp meetings
The congregation at Guthrie hosts the Oklahoma State campmeeting each May and the Oklahoma State assembly meeting each December.

A campground for church of God meetings was built at Monark Springs, Missouri. The original tabernacle was constructed in 1940, and has been expanded more than once.  The tabernacle at Monark is still in use today for the national Church of God campmeeting, with attendance from a number of States and international locations.

The Monark campmeeting begins the third Friday of each July and continues for 10 days. The grounds include dining and sleeping facilities. The Church of God ministry believes in Holy Spirit leadership in the services, allowing liberty for calling of songs, testimonies, and preaching in the general services, as the Lord leads rather than following a prepared schedule. Special services are usually set aside for missionary reports, for observance of foot-washing and the Lord’s supper, and for healing of the sick. The healing service coincides with fast day.

Two meetings are held in Guthrie each year - the Oklahoma State Campmeeting toward the end of May and the Assembly meeting toward the end of December. Both are ten-day meetings. Other major meetings are held in California, West Virginia, and Louisiana each year.

References

Birth of a Reformation - Life and Labors of D. S. Warner, by A. L. Byers
Encyclopedia of American Religions, J. Gordon Melton, editor
Profiles in Belief: the Religious Bodies of the United States and Canada (Vol. III), by Arthur Carl Piepkorn
''Church of God Doctrines (1979 Edition), by Cecil C. Carver

External links
Church of God Website - Doctrines of truth and holiness, books for the seeker, tracts for the believer and unbeliever, recorded messages that can be heard online, beautiful singing and food for the soul.
The Gospel Truth - Church of God teaching
Church of God missionary efforts -  in Africa
Church of God missionary efforts -  in Honduras and India
Testimonies of Saints -  Healing, Salvation, and Sanctification
Church of God Singing -  Congregational and Special Songs
Church of God Preaching - Gospel preaching by Church of God ministry
Predicación - Predicación de la iglesia de Dios en Español
Church of God camp meeting notices - Dates, locations, and contact information for Church of God meetings

Methodism in the United States
Churches in Oklahoma
Guthrie, Oklahoma
Holiness denominations
Holiness pacifism